Sainik School Kazhakootam, Thiruvananthapuram, Kerala, India, is a residential school for boys under the Ministry of Defence, Government of India, located approximately 18 km away from Thiruvananthapuram city beside Kazhakoottam - Venjarammoodu bypass and 1 km away from National Highway 66.

The concept of Sainik Schools originated in the mind of late V. K. Krishna Menon, who was India's first Defence Minister from 1957 to 1962. The objective was to set up schools run on military lines, in each state of India, which would facilitate the grooming of bright young boys for intake into the National Defence Academy, thus, rectifying the regional and class imbalance in the officer cadre of the Indian Military.

Location 

The campus is nestled between the Western Ghats and the Arabian Sea, and serves as the ideal location for an institution of its nature.

The school is located on a laterite cliff of 170 feet elevation that overlooks Laccadive Sea's coast. The St. Ignatius church which is near the sea coast at Puthenthope and the ocean is visible from the cliff. The cliff region is heavily eroded in torrential rains. There are many gully erosion visible inside the campus. The area receives less rainfall and hence the vegetation is mostly cashew plantation and bushes. Earlier there were many acacia and Eucalyptus trees that were found in the campus now they are removed and new tree saplings were planted.

A part of the land that was previously part of the campus (around 75 acres) was handed over to KINFRA in early 2000's on lease.

Inception 
Sainik School Kazhakootam started functioning in the barracks lent by the Indian Army at the army camp at Pangode, Thiruvananthapuram, on 20 January 1962. The initial intake was to classes V, VI, VII, and, VIII, and the strength at inception was 120. This increased to 132 six months later, when admission to class XI was opened. The founder principal, headmaster, and registrar were Lt. Col. B. K. Somaiah, Sqn. Ldr. Babu Lal, and Capt. T. V. S. Nair, respectively.

The foundation stone of the new campus at Kazhakootam was laid by the then Defence Minister of India, V. K. Krishna Menon on 5 February 1962. Prof. J. C. Alexander, a professor at the College of Engineering Trivandrum, designed the academic block, the 11 dormitories, and other associated infrastructure. The school shifted to the new campus in 1964.

School crest, motto, and flag 

The red, navy-blue, and sky-blue stripes in the school crest are symbolic of the three arms of the Indian Defence Services. Red represents Army, Blue represents Navy and Sky blue represents Air Force. The letter S, for Sainik School, stands above the three stripes, and a steel-grey band, with the word Kazhakootam inscribed in it, is present below the stripes. Below the main crest is a fluttering ribbon, carrying the School Motto: Gyaan, Anushasan, Sahyog, signifying three of the most valuable qualities expected of a Sainik School Cadet, namely knowledge, discipline, and esprit-de-corps

The flag, again, has horizontal stripes of the three School Colours, with the school crest at the centre.

School songs and prayer 
The English, Hindi, and Malayalam school songs and the Sanskrit prayer are sung in morning assemblies and on special occasions and functions. The English school song was composed by Mrs Myrtle Jacob, a founding member of the English department of the school. Sam'gacchadhvam', the school Sanskrit prayer, is a verse taken from the Rigveda.

Administration 
Sainik School, Kazhakootam, like the other Sainik Schools, is governed by Sainik Schools Society, which is an autonomous body under the Ministry of Defence, Government of India. Sainik School, Lucknow, which is governed by the UP state government, is an exception. The society is headed by the board of governors, with the Union Defence Minister at the helm. The chief Ministers or Education Ministers are part of the councils of Sainik Schools in their respective states. Further, a senior defence officer chairs a local board of administration. The Air Officer Commanding-in-Chief, Southern Air Command, is in charge of Sainik School, Kazhakootam. The principal, who is the academic and administrative head of the institute, is appointed on deputation, and will be of a rank of colonel or its equivalent from the Indian Navy, or the Indian Air Force. Vice Principal (hitherto headmaster) and Administrative Officer (hitherto Registrar), who are again military officers of or equivalent to the ranks of Lt. Col. or Major, look after the academic and the administrative affairs respectively.

The academic activities are coordinated by a Senior Master who reports to Vice Principal. The non academic activities such as estates is managed by Quarter Master, cadet's Mess by Mess Manager, and Medical Infirmary Room (MI Room) by a Medical Officer. In the absence of Administrative Officer or Registrar the role is handled by the Medical Officer.

Among cadets there are various ranks such as,

Infrastructure and facilities 
Sainik School Kazhakootam is an architectural marvel. The school is well planned, designed and maintained. The symmetry of construction of various buildings in the complex is exemplary.

In academic perspective the school has around 21 class rooms, well equipped state of art laboratories for Physics, Biology and Chemistry departments in school. There is also a computer center and science park. To encourage the artistic skills of students there is also a dedicated arts and craft facility in the school. There is a good library situated within academic block with a good collection of books, magazines and journals.

In extra curricular perspective there is unparallel facilities in school. The first-ever equestrian club of Kerala has been set up at the school. A riding ring with horses and trainers has been set up. There is excellent sports facilities like swimming pool, clay surfaced tennis court, concreted basketball court, volley ball courts, two football grounds in FIFA dimensions, two hockey courts, gymnastics, gymnasium, numerous football grounds etc. that are available. The National Cadet Corps (India) has an independent Company under Kerala - Lakshadweep region for Sainik School Kazhakootam, called SS COY NCC. The school sends numerous cadets to Republic Day Parade held at Delhi every year.

In terms of auxiliary facilities, there is a state of art Cadet's Mess that can dine more than 700 at a time is situated within the campus. There is in house bakery to bake bread within the mess. The school has numerous green initiatives. One such is the pig farming situated within the campus that uses food waste from Cadets Mess as fodder. There are also in-house Laundry facility in the form of Dhobi Ghat, Cobbler facility, Post Office, Barber Shop, stationery, CSD Canteen facility etc within the campus to serve the needs of students. In the fallow land around school cash crops such as cashew is extensively cultivated.

There is a direct water supply pipeline to school from Aruvikkara river by Kerala Water Authority. There are also dedicated transformer facilities by KSEB within campus for continuous power supply. The school has a vast potential to harness Renewable energy such as solar and wind power. There is also Rainwater harvesting facility in the academic block.

Houses 

The school has a residential system of schooling. Only few students who are children of working staff of school enjoy day scholar facility. Others have to compulsorily opt for residential schooling.

The residential system in the school is largely a dormitory based (14 students who are in their final year and are house captains and school captains enjoy single room facility).

These dormitories are called as houses. There are a total of 11 houses and the Houses are categorised into three, viz., Senior houses, Junior houses, and Sub-junior houses.

Every house has an identical and symmetric structure. These dormitory systems have two large halls called wings. Each wing has around 30 beds. Hence approximate strength in a dormitory is around 60 students. In addition to this each dormitories have a common shared washroom facility having around 8 bathrooms and 8 toilets.

Every dormitory has a first floor in which one faculty member resides. This faculty member is called as House Master. The dormitories also have two big study halls and an office room.

Admission 
Presently, boys are admitted to class VI and IX only. All India Sainik Schools Entrance Examination (AISSEE), which are generally held on the first or second Sunday of January, are followed by personal interviews for the shortlisted candidates. Boys who are not under 10 or over 11 years of age on 1 July of the year of admission are eligible for class VI admission. The respective age limits for class IX are 13 and 14.

Written test 
For class VI admission, there will be two papers, viz., (i) Mathematical Knowledge Test & Language Ability Test and (ii) Intelligence Test, and the syllabus will be in line with that of class V CBSE syllabus. The test can be taken in English, Hindi, or Malayalam. For class IX admission the papers for written test are (i) Mathematics & Science and (ii) English and Social Studies, equivalent to class VIII CBSE syllabus. The class IX tests can be taken in only in English. Aspirants can appear for the tests at any of the five locations across Kerala (namely Sainik School Kazhakootam, Kottayam, Ernakulam, Kozhikode, and Palakkad), Kavaratti, and in all other Sainik Schools in India.

Medical test 
The written tests will be followed by a medical test, which is the last stage of the admission procedure.

Faculty 
The school has more than 30 highly qualified and skilled teachers from disciplines such as Sciences, Social Sciences, Mathematics, Computers, Languages, Arts and Crafts. The former senior master of school Shri. K Rajendran from English Department is a recipient of National Award to Teachers (2009) from Hon.President of India Smt. Pratibha Patil on 5 September 2010. Mr K Sudhir (Roll No.1014/ Batch 1980) who was a faculty member during early 90's was the only alumni of the school who turned faculty later.

Popular culture 
The school was featured in multiple Malayalam cinema as location. The movies such as F. I. R. (1999) and The Truth (1998) directed by Shaji Kailas had few sequences shot inside the campus. There was a documentary based on the school that was made by Malayalam Film director Jubith Namradath (an alumnus of the school and director of Aabhaasam) called Marching Ahead (2014). The coordinator of drama club in school and senior faculty member of Malayalam department Smt. Sandhya R. had made a short film on water conservation that was entirely shot in the campus called Neerthulliye Kaanathaya Divasam(2017) many students and faculty had acted in the film. The 20 minute short film won Bharathan Memorial Award 2017.

Notable alumni

See also 
 Sainik School
 National Defence Academy

References

External links
 Official website
 Alumni website

Sainik schools
Boarding schools in Kerala
Boys' schools in India
Schools in Thiruvananthapuram district
Educational institutions established in 1962
1962 establishments in Kerala
History of Kerala (1947–present)